Holdorf railway station may refer to 
Holdorf (Oldb) railway station
Holdorf (Meckl) railway station